John Gauntlett Hirsch (20 February 1883 – 26 February 1958) was a South African rugby union international and first-class cricketer.

Hirsch was born at Port Elizabeth in February 1883. He was educated in England at Shrewsbury School, where he played cricket, football and rugby union for the school. From Shrewsbury, he went up to Clare College at the University of Cambridge, where he studied history. While studying at Cambridge, he played first-class cricket for Cambridge University Cricket Club in 1903 and 1904, making four appearances. He also made two appearances during the same period for London County, captained by W. G. Grace. In six first-class matches, Hirsch scored 144 runs at an average of 15.09 and a high score of 56, which was his only first-class half century. He played rugby union for Cambridge University R.U.F.C., with marked success.

After graduating from Cambridge, Hirsch returned to South Africa where he played rugby for Eastern Province. He impressed enough to be selected for the South African team for their 1906–07 tour of Europe as a three-quarter back, playing one Test match on the tour against Ireland at Belfast. He later made a second Test match appearance against Great Britain at Johannesburg. Hirsch died at Wynberg in February 1958.

References

External links

1883 births
1958 deaths
Rugby union players from Port Elizabeth
People educated at Shrewsbury School
Alumni of Clare College, Cambridge
South African cricketers
London County cricketers
Cambridge University cricketers
South African rugby union players
Cambridge University R.U.F.C. players
Eastern Province Elephants players
South Africa international rugby union players
Cricketers from Port Elizabeth